Richard of Bordeaux (1932) is a play by "Gordon Daviot", a pseudonym for Elizabeth MacKintosh, best known by another of her pen names, Josephine Tey.

The play tells the story of Richard II of England in a romantic fashion, emphasizing the relationship between Richard and his first wife, Queen Anne of Bohemia. The play was a major hit in 1933, playing a significant role in turning its director and leading man John Gielgud into a major star. Audiences found its portrayal of medieval characters speaking like modern people refreshing.

Characters

(In order of their appearance)
Fair Page, Maudelyn
Dark Page
Richard, King of England
Anne, The Queen
Thomas of Woodstock, Duke of Gloucester
John of Gaunt, Duke of Lancaster
Sir Simon Burley
Edmund of Langley, Duke of York
Michael de la Pole, Chancellor of England
Richard, Earl of Arundel
Thomas Arundel, Archbishop of Canterbury
Robert de Vere, Earl of Oxford
Mary, Countess of Derby
Agnes Launcekron, the Queen's waiting-woman
Henry, Earl of Derby
Thomas Mowbray, Earl of Nottingham
Maudelyn, the King's secretary
Sir John Montague
Edward, Earl of Rutland
A Waiting-woman
Doctor
A man in the street
Second man
Third man
Woman with loaves
Woman with vegetables
First page
Second page
Lord Derby's page

Development
Daviot wrote the play after seeing John Gielgud play Shakespeare's Richard II at the Old Vic Theatre, and submitted it to him for production. Gielgud had reservations about the play but agreed to test it out for two matinée performances at the Arts Theatre.

Gielgud finally recognised the play's potential and directed it with himself as Richard at the New Theatre in February 1933. Prior to that production, Gielgud was regarded as a highly respected classical actor based on his performances at the Old Vic, but the overwhelming success of Richard of Bordeaux catapulted him into the status of superstar. The Times praised the rest of the cast, but added:

The principal roles in the production at the New were played as follows:
Richard II – John Gielgud
Anne of Bohemia – Gwen Ffrangcon-Davies
Duke of Gloucester – Eric Stanley
Duke of Lancaster – Ben Webster
Sir Simon Burley – George Howe
Duke of York  – Kinsey Peile
Michael de la Pole – H. R. Hignett
Earl of Arundel  – Frederick Lloyd
Robert de Vere – Francis Lister
Mary Bohun – Margaret Webster
Agnes Launcekron – Barbara Dillon
Henry, Earl of Derby – Henry Mollison
Thomas Mowbray – Donald Wolfit
Sir John Montague – Walter Hudd
John Maudelyn  – Richard Ainley
Edward, Earl of Rutland – Clement McCallin
Thomas Arundel – Rayner Barton
Doctor – Ralph Truman
The play ran for over a year in the West End (a substantial run for its time).

At the time the play was compared to Bernard Shaw's Saint Joan, which was also noted for the refreshingly modern and lighthearted language with which the medieval characters were portrayed speaking. The play depicts Richard in the light of the pacifism that was prevalent at the time, after the carnage of World War I. Richard is portrayed as a gentle, refined individual in a brutal militaristic culture, whose "struggle for peace is fine and ennobling". The depiction of Richard intentionally diverged radically from Shakespeare's portrayal of him as a self-dramatising narcissist preoccupied with his divine right to rule.

Many audience members came to see the play several times, and the production was notable for the fact that souvenir dolls were created and marketed depicting the actors in character.

Productions
It went on to play in the British provinces many times, first on the original tour with Gielgud, then with other actors, on tour and in repertory revivals.  Robert Morley variously played York and Gloucester in it. Michael Redgrave played Richard at Liverpool Playhouse, and John Clements at the Intimate Theatre in Palmer's Green.

The play crossed the Atlantic to Broadway in 1934 with Dennis King as Richard, but without Gielgud in the role, the play ran for only 38 performances.

The play was performed on television in 1938 with Andrew Osborn as Richard and the original Queen Anne, Gwen Ffrangcon-Davies. After the War, Osborn again played the part on the small screen, now with Joyce Heron as the Queen. Peter Cushing starred in 1955 in another BBC television version, which survives and has been shown at the National Film Theatre.

For BBC radio, Griffith Jones played the young King in 1946. Probably because its brand of 1930s pacifism became discredited as appeasement, the play is rarely revived. However, Laurence Payne played the King at the old theatre at Guildford after the War, when Kenneth Williams was John Maudelyn. Gielgud himself reprised his stage role at the microphone in 1941 and 1952. Some of the latter broadcast can be heard on a commercially released recording of Gielgud's audio work. Martin Jarvis was well-received as Richard in a 1974 radio production. Gielgud wrote a letter of congratulation to Jarvis on his performance.

Projected film
Gielgud tried to make one of his then rare film appearances in the role in the 1930s and teamed with Alexander Korda to produce it, but the project fell through. He wrote to Douglas Fairbanks Jr., hoping to interest him in the project, and suggested Lillian Gish for the role of Richard's wife Anne. He later tried to persuade Dirk Bogarde to play the part on film in the 1960s, but to no avail.

In other literature
In Josephine Tey's novel The Daughter of Time, which is about the reputation of King Richard III, the narrator says of the detective hero Alan Grant that though he was no expert on medieval history, "he had in his youth seen Richard of Bordeaux; four times he had seen it".

Nicola Upson's detective novel An Expert in Murder, the title of which is a quotation from the play, was published in 2008. It weaves a whodunnit plot around the original West End production of Richard of Bordeaux. The story involves Josephine Tey and Upson's detective, D.I. Archie Penrose, investigating the murder of one of Tey's young fans. Gielgud is portrayed under the name "John Terry". The novel was serialised on BBC radio in the same year it was published, starring Meg Fraser as Josephine Tey.

References

External links
 
 Text of the play

1932 plays
Plays about English royalty
Plays set in the 14th century
Scottish plays